Cheynee Stiller (born 3 May 1986) is a former professional Australian rules footballer who played for the Brisbane Lions in the Australian Football League.

Stiller was recruited through the 2005 rookie draft and was elevated to the Lions senior list for round 3 of season 2006. He made his debut for the Brisbane Lions in Round 3 against St Kilda and went on to make a total of 13 appearances for the club that season. He earned an AFL Rising Star nomination for his performance against Carlton in round 13.

Stiller graduated from St. Patrick's College, Shorncliffe, Brisbane, in 2003.

External links

 Cheynee Stiller's profile on the official AFL website of the Brisbane Lions Football Club 
 
 

1986 births
Living people
Australian rules footballers from Queensland
Brisbane Lions players
Zillmere Eagles Australian Football Club players
Aspley Football Club players